Colorado Pioneers is a 1945 American Western film in the Red Ryder film series directed by R. G. Springsteen and written by Earle Snell. The film stars Wild Bill Elliott, Robert Blake, Alice Fleming, Roy Barcroft, Bud Geary and Billy Cummings. The film was released on November 14, 1945, by Republic Pictures.

Plot

Perennial western good guy Red Ryder (Bill Elliott) travels to Chicago and captures the thief Bull Reagan (Roy Barcroft) and his two young misguided youths. When Ryder returns home he finds his home has been partially burned out, and his cowhands abandoning his ranch. Ryder and his aunt, "The Duchess", played by Alice Fleming, attempt to reform the young lads, but they haven't seen the last of Bull Reagan. Reagan returns and attempts to lure his former young aids back to the wrong side of the law.

Cast  
Wild Bill Elliott as Red Ryder 
Robert Blake as Little Beaver 
Alice Fleming as The Duchess
Roy Barcroft as Bull Reagan
Bud Geary as Henchman Bill Slade
Billy Cummings as Joe
Freddie Chapman as Skinny
Frank Jaquet as Dave Wyatt
Tom London as Sand Snipe
Monte Hale as Cowhand That Quits
Billie Thomas as Smokey
George Chesebro as Hank Disher
Emmett Vogan as Judge
Tom Chatterton as Father Marion

References

External links 
 
  at Moviefone

1945 films
American Western (genre) films
1945 Western (genre) films
Republic Pictures films
Films directed by R. G. Springsteen
Films based on comic strips
Films based on American comics
American black-and-white films
1940s English-language films
1940s American films
Red Ryder films